TerryWhite Chemmart is an Australian pharmacy retailer owned by the Terry White Group. It is considered to be the largest pharmacy chain in Australia.

History
Terry and Rhonda White opened their first pharmacy in Woody Point, Queensland, in 1959. Their network of owned pharmacies grew steadily over the years. In 1994, they established a pharmacy franchise in Australia.

The Terry White Chemists franchise network continued to grow over the next 11 years. This took the total number of franchised pharmacies within the Terry White Group to 225.

In August 2016, the Terry White Group announced a merger with Chemmart, which created a pharmacy chain with over 500 stores nationally and an annual turnover of A$2 billion. All stores have since been rebranded under the new combined chain with a new name, logo and branding. Since the merger, TerryWhite Chemmart is now the largest pharmacy group in Australia.

In 2011, Terry White AO was inducted into the Queensland Business Leaders Hall of Fame. White also received a Queensland Greats Award in 2012.

Controversy
On 1 December 2016, Terry White Chemists came under fire, after a single franchisee (who is at liberty "stock and sell products at their discretion"), displayed golliwogs underneath a sign reading “Experience a White Christmas”; presumably a pun referring both to the name Terry White Chemists and the popular phrase White Christmas. The alarm about the golliwog dolls was raised when Toowoomba man George Helon spotted the dolls placed beneath the sign and posted a picture of it on Facebook and Twitter.

Australian Aboriginal activist, author and filmmaker Stephen Hagan described Toowoomba as the "most racist city in Australia". Terry White Chemists subsequently banned the sale of such dolls from sale from any franchise nationwide, and the franchisee "unreservedly apologised" for the "regrettable error".

References

External links
 Website
 Rhonda and Terry White Digital Story and Oral History - State Library of Queensland

Retail companies established in 1959
Pharmacies of Australia
Australian companies established in 1959

Terry white chemist stores locations